Jelgava Station is a railway station on the Riga – Jelgava, Jelgava – Liepāja, Jelgava – Meitene, Tukums II – Jelgava and Jelgava – Krustpils railways.

References 

Buildings and structures in Jelgava
Railway stations in Latvia
Railway stations opened in 1868
Semigallia